Adalbert-Gautier Hamman (1910–2000) was a French Franciscan priest (born when his part of Lorraine formed part of the German Empire). His main achievement was the publication of nearly one hundred translations of patristic texts in French, in the collection known as 'Pères dans la Foi', although a complete bibliographical description would extend much further. His liturgical and social writings contributed to the mental climate of the second Vatican Council.

Publications 
 The Paschal mystery : ancient liturgies and patristic texts,(1969) A. Hamman (editor), Staten Island, NY : Alba House, pp. 230 p

Bibliography 

 Adalbert G. Hamman 'l'Abbé Migne du xxe siècle, (2010). Acts of International colloquium  organised on the occasion of centenary birthday and of publication of 'Hommes Illustres' (De viris illustris) of St Jerome, series: "Pères dans la Foi" 100, Paris.

20th-century French Roman Catholic priests
French Franciscans
2000 deaths
1910 births
20th-century French translators
French male writers
Patristic scholars
20th-century male writers